Next to You or Next 2 You may refer to:

Songs 
 "Next to You" (The Police song), 1978, covered by The Offspring and by Ednaswap
 "Next to You", by Paula Abdul from Forever Your Girl, 1988
 "Next to You (Someday I'll Be)", a song by Wilson Phillips from their self-titled album, 1990
 "Next to You" (Darude song), 2003
 "Next to You", by Ciara featuring R. Kelly from Ciara's album Goodies, 2004
 "Next to You" (Melody song), 2005
 "Next 2 You" (Buckcherry song), 2006
 "Next to You" (Mike Jones song), 2008
 "Next to You" (Chris Brown song), 2011
 "Next to You" (L D R U song), 2016
 "Next to You", by Little Big Town from Nightfall, 2020
 "Next to You, Next to Me", a 1990 song
 "Wake Up (Next to You)" (Graham Parker song), 1985

Other
 Next to You (Tammy Wynette album), 1989
 Next to You (film), a 2018 Peruvian romantic comedy film